A special election was held in  on October 11, 1796 to fill a vacancy caused by the resignation of Daniel Hiester (DR) on July 1, 1796

Election results 

George Ege also won the 5th district in the general election.

See also 
List of special elections to the United States House of Representatives

References 

Pennsylvania 1796 05
Pennsylvania 1796 05
1796 05
Pennsylvania 05
United States House of Representatives 05
United States House of Representatives 1796 05